Kristín Aðalbjörg Árnadóttir (born 18 March 1957) is an Icelandic diplomat. She is currently Permanent representative to UN organisations in Vienna as well as ambassador to Slovakia. She was ambassador of gender equality in the Ministry for Foreign Affairs in Reykjavik 2018-2021. Previously, she has served as ambassador to Finland (and non resident ambassador to Estonia, Latvia, Lithuania and Ukraine) (2013-2017), and ambassador to China and several other countries in Asia.

Education
Árnadóttir obtained a master's degree in public administration and governance from Syracuse University.

Career

Early positions
Árnadóttir was originally hired as assistant to the mayor of Reykjavik in 1994. On 29 December 2000 by unanimous decision by the four members of the City Council, she was appointed Director of Development and Information from 2001-2005, later continuing her work in the mayor's office. She was given leave in July 2007 to act as project manager of Iceland's bid to join the UN Security Council, which was voted on in October 2008. She was immediately after the UN vote given the position of head manager and ambassador for the newly combined offices of Minister and Secretary of State within the Icelandic Ministry of Foreign Affairs in November 2008.

Ambassadorship
Árnadóttir was announced as being assigned as Iceland's ambassador to China in October 2009, in replacement of Gunnar Snorri Gunnarsson, the new ambassador to Germany after the position was opened.

From 2010 to 2013, she was an ambassador to China (and non resident ambassador to Australia, Cambodia, Laos, Mongolia, New Zealand, North Korea, South Korea, Thailand and Vietnam)

The credential confirmation for her ambassadorship to China was conducted on 11 January 2010 by then president Hu Jintao. Similarly, her ambassadorship to Vietnam was officially confirmed on 9 December 2010, after presenting her credentials to then President of Vietnam Nguyễn Minh Triết.

She is the ambassador to Slovakia.

Other activities
From 1995 to 2006, Árnadóttir was the vice-president of the organization European Cities Against Drugs (ECAD).

References

Further reading

External links 

Living people
1957 births
Kristin Arnadottir
Icelandic women ambassadors
Kristin Arnadottir
Kristin Arnadottir
Kristin Arnadottir
Kristin Arnadottir
Kristin Arnadottir
Kristin Arnadottir
Kristin Arnadottir
Kristin Arnadottirs
Kristin Arnadottir
Kristin Arnadottir
Kristin Arnadottir
Ambassadors of Iceland to Slovakia
Ambassadors of Iceland to Estonia
Ambassadors of Iceland to Latvia
Ambassadors of Iceland to Lithuania
Ambassadors of Iceland to Ukraine